Passage du Havre is one of the covered passages of Paris. Formerly geared towards fish shops and railway modelling (Hornby, La Maison du Train), the arcade was rebuilt in the late 1990s as a modern mall at the time as the construction of Paris' RER E underground railway line, to welcome new shops more in keeping with the Quartier de l'Opéra-Saint Lazare, the heart of Paris major business district.

The passage is near Gare Saint-Lazare and opposite the Hilton Paris Opera (the station's hotel). It begins at Place du Havre and leads onto Rue de Caumartin where it ends.

The shopping centre is owned and maintained by Eurocommercial Properties N.V..

See also
Passages couverts de Paris

References

Streets in the 9th arrondissement of Paris
Covered passages of Paris
Buildings and structures in the 9th arrondissement of Paris
1845 establishments in France